Rúben Dinarte Martins Andrade (born 7 June 1982) is a Portuguese retired professional footballer who played as a central midfielder.

Football career
Born in Funchal, Madeira, Andrade all but played for local C.F. União after signing in 1999 to complete his formation. On 18 June 2000, whilst still a junior, he made his debut with the senior team, playing 45 minutes in a 2–0 away win against Juventude Sport Clube for the third division championship.

In the following seasons, Andrade alternated between the second and third levels of Portuguese football, playing his first game in the former competition on 3 November 2002 by coming on as a 72nd-minute substitute in a 0–0 home draw against Leça FC. He scored a career-best 11 goals (from 33 appearances) in 2009–10, but the side failed to promote from division three.

Andrade contributed with six goals in 41 games in the 2014–15 campaign, as União returned to the Primeira Liga after an absence of more than two decades, and on 1 June 2015 he renewed his contract for another year. His maiden appearance in the competition occurred on 16 August at the age of 33 years and two months, as he started and featured 68 minutes in a 2–1 derby home win over C.S. Marítimo.

Honours
União Madeira
Portuguese Second Division: 2001–02, 2010–11
Taça AF Madeira: 2002–03, 2004–05

References

External links

1982 births
Living people
Sportspeople from Funchal
Portuguese footballers
Madeiran footballers
Association football midfielders
Primeira Liga players
Liga Portugal 2 players
Segunda Divisão players
C.F. União players